The International Union of Catholic Esperantists (IKUE) is an organization of Catholic Esperanto speakers. It was founded in 1910 in Paris and is now headquartered in Rome.

Activities
IKUE organizes Masses during Esperanto meetings, and also each year its own week-long international convention. Associations and local groups of Catholic Esperantists also offer meetings (Bible weekends, youth camps, etc.)

IKUE publishes Christian literature in Esperanto, e.g. the ecumenical prayer and hymnbook ADORU of 1,472 pages in 2001 (co-edited with the Protestant Esperantist association), and the encyclical Deus caritas est in 2006. Its magazine Espero Katolika (Catholic Hope) first appeared in 1903.

Recognition from the Vatican
All popes from Pius X onwards have welcomed and supported the Esperanto movement.

In 1977, Vatican Radio began regular broadcasts in Esperanto (three times a week since 1998). In 1990, the Congregation for Divine Worship and the Discipline of the Sacraments approved the Esperanto translation of the prayers of the Mass. The Esperanto Missal and Lectionary for Sundays and Feastdays was published in 1995. In 1994, Pope John Paul II began to include Esperanto among the languages of his annual Easter and Christmas greetings; at Easter 2006, Pope Benedict XVI continued this tradition of his predecessor.

External links
 IKUE's web site (in Esperanto)

International associations of the faithful
Catholic lay organisations
Esperanto organizations
Organizations established in 1910
1910 establishments in France
Organisations based in Rome
Organizations based in Paris
Esperanto in France